Kenneth David Kirkland (September 28, 1955 – November 12, 1998) was an American pianist and keyboardist.

Biography

Early life
Born in Brooklyn, New York, United States, Kirkland was six when he first sat down at a piano keyboard. After years of Catholic schooling, Kirkland enrolled at the Manhattan School of Music, where he studied classical piano performance, classical theory and composition.

Career
Kirkland's first professional work came with Polish fusion violinist Michal Urbaniak, touring throughout Europe with his group in 1977. Coincidentally, his next high-profile gig was with another Eastern European jazz émigré, Miroslav Vitous. Kirkland is featured on Vitous' ECM recordings First Meeting and Miroslav Vitous Group.

In 1980, while Kirkland was on tour in Japan with Terumasa Hino, he met Wynton Marsalis, which began his long association with both Wynton and his older brother Branford. On Wynton’s self-titled debut album, Kirkland shared the piano duties with one of his musical influences, Herbie Hancock, but was the sole pianist on Marsalis's subsequent releases Think of One, Hot House Flowers and Black Codes (From the Underground).

In 1985 Kirkland (alongside Branford Marsalis) joined the Blue Turtles, the jazz-pop studio-and-touring backing band put together by Sting to perform the latter's post-Police solo work and which can be heard on his first two solo releases The Dream of the Blue Turtles and Bring on the Night. Although the Blue Turtles would be a relatively short-lived outfit (performing two or three years of high-profile touring before Sting opted to continue with more traditional pop lineups), Kirkland would maintain his musical relationship with Sting afterwards, performing various piano and keyboard parts on subsequent studio albums.

Following his time in the Wynton Marsalis band, Kirkland's main musical collaborator would be  Branford Marsalis, whose quartet he joined in 1986 as a founder member. He is also featured on Branford’s funk band album Buckshot Lefonque. When Branford Marsalis assumed the high-visibility role of bandleader for NBC TV's The Tonight Show with Jay Leno, Kirkland became the band's pianist.

In 1991, he released his debut as a leader, Kenny Kirkland, on GRP Records. Thunder And Rainbows (1991, Sunnyside Records), by "Jazz from Keystone", is a trio album with Kirkland, Charles Fambrough, and Jeff "Tain" Watts.

Leading up to and on June 1–3, 1998, Kirkland worked with long-time associate "Tain" Watts on the drummer's debut recording Citizen Tain. According to producer Delfeayo Marsalis, "He was clearly not in good shape." When asked about going to the doctor, Kirkland responded, "After the session. If I go now, they'll make me check into a hospital." On June 4, doctors told Kirkland he had a congestive heart condition that required an operation. He attributed his poor health to twenty years of touring without adequate vacations and exercise, and deemed his chances of surviving any surgery 50/50 or less. Fearful of having a cardiac procedure, Kirkland accepted his fate and was soon on the road with Branford Marsalis again. On November 7, 1998, Kirkland attended Marsalis's wedding in New Rochelle, New York.  Kirkland was found dead in his Queens apartment on Friday, November 13, 1998.

The official doctor's report listed his death as due to congestive heart failure. He was survived by his mother, brother and two sisters.

Philosophy
In a video interview with Sting published on Aug 29, 2020 as part of the Doctone Project, Sting relates about Kirkland’s playing philosophy as follows: “I learned a lot from him—that way of approaching harmony where there are no wrong notes, just the note that you follow with... there are no mistakes in a Kenny Kirkland solo. What you think is wrong momentarily is suddenly put right by a choice, so that philosophy was something I learned at his feet... You can bring that into life, too. We all make mistakes, [but] it’s how we cope with them or how we react next, so that for me is the essence of jazz. You take a risk and you’re rewarded by your subsequent choices.”

Discography

As leader
Kenny Kirkland (GRP, 1991)

As sideman 

With Chico Freeman
 Peaceful Heart, Gentle Spirit (Contemporary, 1980)
 The Pied Piper (BlackHawk, 1986) – recorded in 1984

With Kenny Garrett
 Black Hope (Warner Bros., 1992)
 Songbook (Warner Bros., 1997)

With Dizzy Gillespie
 Closer to the Source (Atlantic, 1984)
 New Faces (GRP, 1985)

With Elvin Jones
 Earth Jones (Palo Alto, 1982)
 Brother John (Palo Alto, 1984) – recorded in 1982

With Rodney Jones
 Articulation' (Timeless Muse, 1979)
 Dreams and Stories' (Savant, 2005)

With Branford Marsalis
 Scenes in the City (Columbia,1983)
 Royal Garden Blues (CBS, 1986)
 Renaissance (Columbia, 1987)
 Random Abstract (CBS, 1987)
 Crazy People Music (Sony Music, 1990)
 Mo' Better Blues Soundtrack (Sony Music, 1990)
 I Heard You Twice the First Time (Sony Music, 1992)
 Requiem (Sony Music, 1999)

With Wynton Marsalis
 Wynton Marsalis (Columbia, 1982) – recorded in 1981
 Think of One (Columbia, 1983)
 Hot House Flowers (Columbia, 1984)
 Black Codes (Columbia, 1985)

With Sting
 The Dream of the Blue Turtles (A&M, 1985)
 Bring on the Night (A&M, 1986)
 ...Nothing Like the Sun (A&M, 1987)
 ...Nada como el sol (A&M, 1988)
 The Soul Cages (A&M, 1991)
 Mercury Falling (A&M, 1996)

With Miroslav Vitous
 1979: First Meeting (ECM, 1980)
 1980: Miroslav Vitous Group (ECM, 1981)

With Jeff "Tain" Watts
 Megawatts (Sunnyside, 1991)
 Citizen Tain (Columbia, 1999)

With others
 Stone Alliance, Heads Up (PM, 1980)
 Franco Ambrosetti, Wings (Enja, 1984) – recorded in 1983
 Niels Bijl, Mozaik (Aliud, 2010)
 Terence Blanchard, Jazz in Film (Sony, 1999) – recorded in 1998
 Carla Bley, Heavy Heart (Watt, 1984) – recorded in 1983
 Michael Brecker, Michael Brecker (impulse!, 1987)
 Hiram Bullock,  From All Sides  (Atlantic, 1986)
 Billy Hart, Rah (Gramavision, 1988)
 Jay Hoggard, Rain Forest (Contemporary, 1981) – recorded in 1980
 Robert Hurst, One for Namesake (DIW, 1994) – recorded in 1993
 David Liebman, What It Is (CBS/Sony, 1980) – recorded in 1979
 Delfeayo Marsalis, Pontius Pilate's Decision (1992)
 Arturo Sandoval, I Remember Clifford (GRP, 1992)
 John Scofield, Who's Who? (Arista, 1979)
 Lew Soloff, But Beautiful (Paddle Wheel, 1987)

References

External links
 Obituary reprinted from the Daily Telegraph
 

1955 births
1998 deaths
African-American pianists
American jazz keyboardists
American jazz pianists
American male pianists
GRP Records artists
Manhattan School of Music alumni
Musicians from Brooklyn
20th-century American pianists
Jazz musicians from New York (state)
20th-century American male musicians
American male jazz musicians
GRP All-Star Big Band members
Branford Marsalis Quartet members
The Tonight Show Band members
A&M Records artists
20th-century African-American musicians